Nam-kyu, also spelled Nam-gyu, is a Korean unisex given name. Its meaning depends on the hanja used to write each syllable of the given name. There are five hanja with the reading "nam" and 20 hanja with the reading "gyu" on the South Korean government's list of hanja which may be registered for use in given names.

Park Nam-gyu (born 1936), South Korean sport shooter
Yoo Nam-kyu (born 1968), South Korean table tennis player
Jeong Nam-gyu (1969–2009), South Korean serial killer
Lim Nam-kyu (born 1989), South Korean luger

See also
List of Korean given names

References

Korean unisex given names